Xylota boninensis is a species of hoverfly in the family Syrphidae.

Distribution
Bonin Islands.

References

Eristalinae
Insects described in 1963
Diptera of Asia